Jolyon C. Dantzig (Jol Dantzig) is an American artist, songwriter, designer, guitarist, luthier, author and one of the founders of Hamer Guitars.

Biography
Born in Chicago, Jolyon (Jol) Dantzig began playing guitar and piano in grade school. He studied guitar with local teachers, most notably local blues guitarist Michael Bloomfield. Dantzig attended Evanston Township High School where he studied photography. Dantzig continued his art education at the Art Institute of Chicago. While still in his early twenties, he became a touring musician, playing guitar, bass and singing in numerous rock and R&B bands. Dantzig also supported himself by buying and selling used guitars and running a band equipment rental company.

In 1970, Dantzig became a partner in Northern Prairie Music, one of the first shops selling "vintage" instruments to professional musicians and collectors. Northern Prairie was started by Craig Hendee. Hendee's protégé was a young guitarist named Paul Hamer. Dantzig met Hendee and Hamer through a mutual friend. Dantzig became a partner in the business after Hendee left.

In 1973 Dantzig along with repairman John Montgomery, built a custom bass guitar.  They began supplying custom guitars directly to musicians via the Northern Prairie storefront and through advertisements in Guitar Player magazine under the "Hamer" name in 1974. Hamer Guitars was incorporated in 1976.

During the 1970s and 80s Hamer Guitars grew in size and reputation. During this period Dantzig designed instruments for many of biggest names in music including all four of The Beatles, three of The Rolling Stones and every member of The Pretenders, Def Leppard and The Police.  Hamer Guitars was acquired by Kaman Music (a distribution firm) in 1988.  Kaman Music (and Hamer Guitars) was acquired by Fender Musical Instruments Inc. in 2007.

Dantzig relocated to Northern California to start the Dantzig Design Group, a graphic design and Internet content company. He also served as a consultant to Kaman Music and a host of other music industry companies.

At the request of Bill Kaman, Dantzig returned to Hamer as Technical Director in 1997, when  the facility was moved to Connecticut. Dantzig is active in the design and manufacture of Hamer's high-end custom guitars, as well as developing products for other clients via his Dantzig Design company.

Hamer was acquired by Fender Musical Instruments in 2008. Dantzig worked in various capacities for Fender until early 2010.
In early 2010 Dantzig left Fender and is building instruments under the Dantzig name.

Dantzig's hobby is collecting, working on and racing vintage sports cars.

Dantzig resides in Connecticut where he is the owner of Jol Dantzig Design.

Guitar building achievements
One of Dantzig's most famous pieces is an orange five-neck guitar built in 1981 for Rick Nielsen of the band Cheap Trick. This guitar was exhibited at the Boston Museum of Fine Art. Some of Dantzig's other designs were also featured in an exhibition at the Smithsonian Institution. Dantzig's guitar designs have earned eight Editors Pick awards from Guitar Player Magazine.

Musical achievements
Although Dantzig was busy with his various business ventures, he has remained an active musician. Over the years he has written and performed music for several feature films including End of the Line and One More Saturday Night. His guitar and vocal work appears on recordings by Freddie Scott, Buddy Guy, Wilson Pickett, Frank Black, Jim Carrol and Shaw-Blades.

References

External links
 
 Hamer Guru Tour
 New York Times article
Jol Dantzig Interview - NAMM Oral History Library (2009)

American luthiers
Living people
School of the Art Institute of Chicago alumni
Year of birth missing (living people)
Musicians from Chicago